Spumellaria is an order of radiolarians in the class Polycystinea. They are ameboid protists appearing in abundance in the world's oceans, possessing a radially-symmetrical silica (opal) skeleton that has ensured their preservation in fossil records. They belong among the oldest Polycystine organisms, dating back to the lower Cambrian (ca. 515 million years). Historically, many concentric radiolarians have been included in the Spumellaria order based on the absence of the initial spicular system, an early-develop structure that, by its lacking, sets them apart from Entactinaria despite their similar morphology. Living exemplars of the order feed by catching prey, such as copepod nauplii or tintinnids, on the adhesive ends of their pseudopodia extending radially from their skeleton; however, some have been observed as mixotrophs living in symbiosis with various photosynthetic algal organisms such as dinoflagellates, cyanobacteria, prasinophytes or haptophytes, which may cause their distribution to center in the greatest abundance and diversity within trophical waters.

Families

 Actinommidae
 Anakrusidae
 Angulobracchiidae
 Archaeospongoprunidae
 Astrosphaeridae
 Bolenidae
 Catenopylidae
 Cavaspongiidae
 Coccodiscidae
 Conocaryommidae
 Dactyliosphaeridae
 Emiluviidae
 Entapiidae
 Ethmosphaeridae
 Gomberellidae
 Hagiastridae
 Heliodiscidae
 Hexaporobrachiidae
 Larnacillidae
 Leugeonidae
 Litheliidae
 Miropylidae
 Myelastridae
 Oertlispongidae
 Orbiculiformidae
 Pantanelliidae
 Parasaturnalidae
 Parvivaccidae
 Patulibracchiidae
 Patruliidae
 Phacodiscidae
 Phaseliformidae
 Praeconocaryommidae
 Pseudoacanthocircidae
 Pseudoaulophacidae
 Pyloniidae
 Pyramispongiidae
 Relindellidae
 Spongodiscidae
 Sponguridae
 Stylosphaeridae
 Thalassicollidae
 Tholoniidae
 Tritrabidae
 Veghicycliidae
 Xiphostylidae

In addition, several taxa in this order are still considered incertae sedis.

Gallery

References

External links

Radiolarian orders
Taxa named by Christian Gottfried Ehrenberg